The Chairman of the Council of Ministers of the Soviet Union was the head of the government of the Soviet Union during the existence of the Council of Ministers of the Soviet Union from 1946 to 1991.

Powers
The appointment of the Chairman of the Council of Ministers of the Soviet Union was carried out by the Supreme Soviet of the Soviet Union. The powers of the Chairman of the Council of Ministers of the Soviet Union included the following:
Management of the activities of the government of the Soviet Union;
Selection of candidates for government members for approval by the Supreme Soviet of the Soviet Union;
Submission of proposals to the Supreme Soviet of the Soviet Union on the appointment and dismissal of members of the government (with the approval of the Supreme Soviet of the Soviet Union or the Presidium of the Supreme Soviet of the Soviet Union);
Organization of the work of the Council of Ministers and its Presidium and management of their meetings;
Coordination of the activities of their deputies;
Ensuring collegiality in the work of the Government;
Representation of the Soviet Union in international relations;
Taking decisions in urgent cases on certain issues of public administration.

On October 14, 1964, the Plenum of the Central Committee of the Communist Party of the Soviet Union, which relieved Nikita Khrushchev of his duties as First Secretary of the Central Committee of the Communist Party of the Soviet Union and Chairman of the Council of Ministers of the Soviet Union, recognized it inappropriate to further combine the highest party post and the post of head of government.

Despite its broad powers, the personal power of the Chairman of the Council of Ministers of the Soviet Union was significantly limited. For example, the Chairman of the Council of Ministers did not have the right to independently appoint and dismiss members of the government of the Soviet Union – including ministers and chairmen of state committees – and other members of the government; this right belonged to the Supreme Soviet of the Soviet Union (and in the period between its sessions – the Presidium of the Supreme Soviet). The appointment of deputy ministers of the Soviet Union, deputy chairmen of state committees of the Soviet Union and members of collegiums of ministries and state committees, as well as issues of the country's economic policy and its implementation by central government bodies, were the subject of collegial consideration by members of the government. The same applied to decisions on the creation, reorganization, abolition, personnel and activities of subordinate bodies of the Council of Ministers of the Soviet Union, including bodies created to systematically check the implementation of government decisions. These decisions were not taken by the head of government alone, but by a majority vote of the members of the Council of Ministers or its Presidium. The limited influence that the head of the Soviet government could personally exert on the activities of members of the government and government agencies is illustrated by the words of Alexei Kosygin, Chairman of the Council of Ministers of the Soviet Union, one of the initiators of the 1965 economic reform, said in an interview with the head of the government of Czechoslovakia, Lubomir Strougal in 1971:

List (with deputies)
Here are lists of chairmen of the Council of Ministers of the Soviet Union, first deputies and deputy chairmen of the Council of Ministers of the Soviet Union. The list of the chairmen of the Council of Ministers of the Soviet Union is given in chronological order. Alphabetical lists of first deputies and deputies are given for each chairman. The dates of the person in office are indicated in parentheses.

See also
Council of Ministers of the Soviet Union
Head of the Government of the Soviet Union
Chairman of the Council of People's Commissars of the Soviet Union
Prime Minister of the Soviet Union

References

Lists of government ministers of the Soviet Union